Chitarwata can refer to:

 The Chitarwata Formation, a geological formation in western Pakistan.
 The Chitarwata Post located in the Sulaiman Mountains, Punjab, Pakistan